Frédéric Swarts (2 September 1866 – 6 September 1940) was a Belgian chemist who prepared the first chlorofluorocarbon, CF2Cl2 (Freon-12) as well as several other related compounds.  He was a professor in the civil engineering at the University of Ghent. In addition to his work on organofluorine chemistry, he authored the textbook "Cours de Chimie Organique." He was a son of Theodore Swarts (chemist, *1839 Antwerpen; †1911 Kortenberg, Belgium) and a colleague of Leo Baekeland.

References

20th-century Belgian inventors
Belgian chemists
1866 births
1940 deaths
Academic staff of Ghent University